Banna Ridge is a rock ridge that rises over  and extends from Banna Peak northeast toward the head of Hatherton Glacier. The ridge forms the southeast wall of Abus Valley in the northwest part of the Britannia Range. It was named in association with Banna Peak by a University of Waikato (New Zealand) geological party, 1978–79.

Further reading
 Campbell S. Nelson, The working life of Michael John Selby (1936–2018): A highly influential late 20th century New Zealand geomorphologist and university leader, Geoscience Society of New Zealand, 2018, P 32

References
 

Ridges of Oates Land